Nicole Gibbs and Asia Muhammad were the defending champions, but chose not to participate.

Beatrice Gumulya and Jessy Rompies won the title, defeating Hsu Chieh-yu and Marcela Zacarías in the final, 6–2, 6–3.

Seeds

Draw

Draw

References
Main Draw

RBC Pro Challenge - Doubles